The London and North Western Railway (LNWR) Class G1 was a class of 0-8-0 steam locomotives.  It was a superheated version of the LNWR Class G with 8 inch piston valves. The prototype was rebuilt in 1912 from a member of Class G and a further 170 new locomotives were built between 1912 and 1918. In addition, 278 older locomotives were rebuilt to the G1 specification between 1917 and 1934.

Numbering
Numbering is somewhat complicated. The LNWR used a numbering system based on the lowest available number, with the result that the numbers were scattered through the stock book.  The London, Midland and Scottish Railway (LMS) renumbered the engines into a more logical series. However, they also then continued to rebuild engines, which retained the numbers originally assigned by the LMS. British Railways (BR) inherited 98 locomotives in 1948 and numbered them in the range 48892-49384. The number series is not continuous because some numbers in the same range were given to G2A Class locomotives.

Construction and rebuilding list

Some were rebuilt back from Class G2a to Class G1 as they passed through heavy overhaul and received lower pressure boilers. Some were even purchased by the Railway Operating Division.

References

Further reading

 Bob Essery & David Jenkinson An Illustrated Review of LMS Locomotives Vol. 2 Absorbed Pre-Group Classes Western and Central Divisions
 Edward Talbot, The London & North Western Railway Eight-Coupled Goods Engines
 Willie Yeadon, Yeadon's Compendium of LNWR Locomotives Vol 2 Goods Tender Engines

G1
0-8-0 locomotives
Standard gauge steam locomotives of Great Britain
Railway locomotives introduced in 1901
D h2 locomotives
Railway Operating Division locomotives
Scrapped locomotives